The title Duchess of Albany may refer to:

People
The title Duchess of Albany, held by the wives of the Dukes of Albany, may refer to: 
 Isabella, Countess of Lennox, wife of Murdoch Stewart
 Anne, Countess of Auvergne, wife of John Stewart
 Anne Hyde, first wife of James, Duke of York
 Mary of Modena (1658–1718), second wife of James, Duke of York, later Queen of England and Scotland
 Charlotte Stuart, Duchess of Albany, illegitimate daughter of Bonnie Prince Charlie 
 Princess Helena of Waldeck and Pyrmont, wife of Prince Leopold, Duke of Albany, youngest son of Queen Victoria
 Princess Victoria Adelaide of Schleswig-Holstein, wife of Charles Edward, Duke of Saxe-Coburg and Gotha, Duke of Albany

Vehicles
 Duchess of Albany, an iron 3-masted ship named after Princess Helena of Waldeck and Pyrmont 
 , a passenger vessel
 Duchess of Albany, one of the GWR 3031 Class locomotives that were built for and run on the Great Western Railway between 1891 and 1915

Other 
 Clematis texensis, a plant sometimes known as 'Duchess of Albany'

See also
 Duke of Albany, a peerage title

Extinct dukedoms in the Jacobite Peerage